Maurício Pereira (born November 8, 1959) is a Brazilian singer-songwriter, lyricist, journalist, saxophonist, television announcer, stage actor and record producer best known for his work with experimental rock duo Os Mulheres Negras.

Biography
Pereira was born in São Paulo on November 8, 1959. He met musician André Abujamra (son of actor Antônio Abujamra) in 1984, and in the following year they formed Os Mulheres Negras. The duo released two albums, Música e Ciência (1988) and Música Serve pra Isso (1990), through WEA (present-day Warner Music Group) before disbanding in 1991. Both musicians then began their respective solo careers, with Pereira becoming Marcelo Rubens Paiva's bandleader for his talk show Fanzine, hosted by TV Cultura in the early 1990s.

In 1995 Pereira released his debut solo album, Na Tradição, through Tinitus. It was positively reviewed by the critics and public alike. In 1996 he performed at the Centro Cultural São Paulo in what would be the first show in Brazil to be live streamed on the Internet, through his official website. In 1998 he released his second album, Mergulhar na Surpresa, which counted with a guest appearance by pianist Daniel Szafran in their first of many collaborations together.

In 2003 Pereira formed a side project, Turbilhão de Ritmos, and with them he released Canções que um Dia Você Já Assobiou, Vol. 1. It is a cover album containing iterations of old-fashioned songs, recorded live at the Instituto Itaú Cultural. Turbilhão de Ritmos came out with a second album in 2010, Carnaval Turbilhão, a compilation of Carnival marchinhas mostly in public domain.

In 2007 Pereira released Pra Marte, his third solo album, notable for containing the song "Trovoa", which was covered by many bands and artists such as Metá Metá, Maria Gadú, A Banda Mais Bonita da Cidade and Dandara & Paulo Monarco. In the same year he was a guest musician on Rogério Skylab's album Skylab VII; Skylab, an unabashed fan of Os Mulheres Negras, co-wrote alongside Pereira the track "O Mundo Tá Sempre Girando"; he also performs additional vocals in it. Two years later, he appeared on Skylab's live album Skylab IX.

In 2010 Pereira was also featured in Rhaissa Bittar's debut album Voilà; he was a co-writer for the track "Piquenique no Horto".

In 2012 he and Abujamra reformed Os Mulheres Negras, and they continue touring ever since. The following year he was interviewed for a documentary about the duo's history, entitled Música É para Isso: Uma História d'Os Mulheres Negras, directed by Bel Bechara and Sandro Serpa.

In 2014 he released his fourth solo album, Pra Onde que Eu Tava Indo.

His most recent album, Outono no Sudeste, came out on May 11, 2018.

Since 2015 Pereira is part of The Universal Maurício Orchestra, a samba rock/jazz ensemble in which all of its musicians are named Maurício. Besides Pereira, the band is also composed of Maurício Tagliari (electric guitar), Maurício Takara (drums), Maurício Bussab (keyboards), Maurício Badê (percussion) and Maurício Fleury (bass guitar). They released their first, self-titled album through YB Music in 2018.

Personal life
One of Pereira's sons, Martim "Tim" Bernardes, is a founding member of indie rock band O Terno. Father and son are part of the duo Pereirinha & Pereirão, which play, in their words, "pop folk country music from the deep Southeast".

Discography

With Os Mulheres Negras

Solo

With Turbilhão de Ritmos

With The Universal Maurício Orchestra

Guest appearances
Beto Furquim
 2008: Muito Prazer (additional vocals and saxophone in "Longe do Planeta")

 Rogério Skylab
 2007: Skylab VII (lyrics, additional vocals and saxophone in "O Mundo Tá Sempre Girando")
 2009: Skylab IX (lyrics, additional vocals and saxophone in "O Mundo Tá Sempre Girando")

Rhaissa Bittar
 2010: Voilà (lyrics for "Piquenique no Horto")

Filmography
 2013: Música É para Isso: Uma História d'Os Mulheres Negras – himself

References

External links
 
 
 

1959 births
Living people
20th-century Brazilian male singers
20th-century Brazilian singers
21st-century Brazilian male singers
21st-century Brazilian singers
Brazilian rock singers
Brazilian rock musicians
Indie rock musicians
Indie pop musicians
Brazilian saxophonists
Male saxophonists
Brazilian record producers
Musicians from São Paulo
Brazilian experimental musicians
Brazilian male stage actors
Radio and television announcers
Brazilian journalists
20th-century saxophonists
21st-century saxophonists
Brazilian male singer-songwriters